The 1994 Mobil Cotton Bowl Classic was the fifty-eighth edition of the college football bowl game, played January 1, 1994, at the Cotton Bowl in Dallas, Texas. The game featured the Notre Dame Fighting Irish versus the Southwest Conference champion Texas A&M Aggies. The game was a rematch of the 1993 Cotton Bowl, which Notre Dame also won. Furthermore, Notre Dame had the chance with its win to split the national championship with Florida State, whom they had beaten earlier in the season.

References

Cotton Bowl
Cotton Bowl Classic
Notre Dame Fighting Irish football bowl games
Texas A&M Aggies football bowl games
Cotton Bowl Classic
Bowl Coalition
January 1994 sports events in the United States
1990s in Dallas
1994 in Texas